Gary Bell Jr. (born October 12, 1992) is an American professional basketball player who last played for Aris of the Greek Basket League. He played college basketball at Gonzaga. He is a 1.90 m (6'2 ") tall shooting guard.

High school
Bell attended Kentridge High School, in Kent, Washington, where he played high school basketball. He was named Washington Mr. Basketball in 2011.

College career
Bell played NCAA Division I college basketball at Gonzaga University, with the Gonzaga Bulldogs, from 2011 to 2015. He was named to the West Coast Conference All-Freshman team in 2012, and was named All-West Coast Conference Honorable Mention in 2013. He was named the West Coast Conference Defensive Player of the Year and All-West Coast Conference Second Team in 2015.

Professional career
Bell began his pro career in the 2015–16 season, with the Polish League club Siarka Tarnobrzeg. He then moved to the Polish club Rosa Radom, before joining the French League club Cholet Basket. He joined the Greek League club Aris for the 2017–18 season. On June 28, 2018, Bell resigned for another season with Aris.

References

External links
Twitter
FIBA Champions League Profile
RealGM.com Profile
Eurobasket.com Profile
French League Profile 
College Bio

1992 births
Living people
American expatriate basketball people in France
American expatriate basketball people in Greece
American expatriate basketball people in Poland
American men's basketball players
Aris B.C. players
Siarka Tarnobrzeg (basketball) players
Basketball players from Washington (state)
Cholet Basket players
Gonzaga Bulldogs men's basketball players
Sportspeople from Kent, Washington
Rosa Radom players
Shooting guards